Johnas Henriksson (born 29 December 1976) is a Swedish footballer who plays for Grebbestads IF as a midfielder.

References

External links
 

1976 births
Living people
Swedish footballers
Allsvenskan players
Superettan players
BK Häcken players
IFK Göteborg players
GAIS players
Association football midfielders